Claremont School of Theology (CST) is a private graduate school focused on religion and theology and located in Claremont, California. It is an official theological school of the United Methodist Church. Although it is accredited by the WASC Senior College and University Commission, it is accredited with a "notice of concern"; it is also accredited by the Association of Theological Schools in the United States and Canada (ATS).

History

Founded as the Maclay School of Theology in San Fernando, California, in 1885, (and thus Claremont Lincoln University) the Methodist seminary was founded by Charles Maclay, founder of the town of San Fernando, former Methodist minister and state senator. The school became affiliated with the University of Southern California (USC) from 1900 to 1957, staying on the USC campus until it moved to its present location in Claremont. The school is one of thirteen seminaries affiliated with the United Methodist Church, though usually more than forty different denominations are represented in the student body in any given school term.

In a 2008 meeting, the board of trustees set in motion the Claremont University Project by approving the following mission statement: "As an ecumenical and inter-religious institution, Claremont School of Theology seeks to instill students with the ethical integrity, religious intelligence, and intercultural understanding necessary to become effective in thought and action as leaders in the increasingly diverse, multireligious world of the 21st century." On May 16, 2011, the University Project was officially named Claremont Lincoln University. In doing so, CST became a founding member of a new multireligious consortium - this was the original intent for Claremont Lincoln University (CLU). On April 21, 2014, CST's board of trustees announced an official end to the relationship with Claremont Lincoln University. The mutual split resulted from an acknowledgement that both institutions' "fundamental philosophies have diverged" when "Claremont Lincoln decided to move away from its interreligious roots and become a secular-focused university" after CLU announced "a decision to discontinue several of its programs". In the same announcement, CST's board of trustees affirmed a commitment to maintaining relationships with its partner schools (the Academy for Jewish Religion (California) and Bayan Claremont).

In July 2017, after failing to reach agreement with Claremont Graduate University about a land deal, CST began negotiations to merge with Willamette University in Salem, Oregon. After the signing of a memorandum of understanding in May 2019, in July 2020, the school began the 2-3 year process of moving to and embedding with Willamette. In 2021, following years of legal battles between the Claremont Consortium, the Claremont School of Theology decided to "maintain its presence in Southern California with its main campus located in Claremont, while also retaining a partnership in Salem with Willamette".

CST is home to the Ancient Biblical Manuscript Center (ABMC), a research center devoted to the documentary history of Judaism and Christianity. It also houses the Center for Process Studies (CPS), a joint faculty center of Claremont School of Theology and the Claremont Graduate University. The CPS promotes a "relational approach" found in process thought, specifically process theology. CST also has a strong representation of students and faculty from all along the Pacific Rim. It houses the Center for Pacific and Asian-American Ministries (CPAAM), which provides ministerial education and other services to enhance ministry to Pacific and Asian American constituencies of all denominations.

Among the non-Methodist institutions sharing the CST campus are the Episcopal Theological School at Claremont and the Disciples Seminary Foundation.

Accreditation
The school is accredited by the WASC Senior College and University Commission. , the commission had the Claremont School of Theology listed as "Accredited with Notice of Concern" related to a commission action from February 2020. The school is also accredited by the Association of Theological Schools in the United States and Canada (ATS).

Notable faculty
 Jon Berquist
 Philip Clayton
 John B. Cobb (emeritus)
 Monica Coleman (emerita)
 Jane Dempsey Douglass
 Roland Faber
 David Ray Griffin (emeritus)
 Rolf Knierim (emeritus)
 Burton L. Mack (emeritus)
 Dennis R. MacDonald
 James M. Robinson (emeritus)
 Rosemary Radford Ruether
 James A. Sanders (emeritus)
 Deepak Shimkhada (adjunct)
 Marjorie Hewitt Suchocki (emerita)
 Marvin A. Sweeney

Notable alumni
 David Augsburger
 Michel Weber
 Thomas Jay Oord
 Robert B. "Bobs" Watson
 Rosemary Radford Ruether
 Mary Elizabeth Moore
 Tripp Fuller

References

External links
 
 

United Methodist seminaries
Seminaries and theological colleges in California
Schools accredited by the Western Association of Schools and Colleges
Educational institutions established in 1885
Claremont, California
San Gabriel Valley
1885 establishments in California